Dano Halsall (born February 16, 1963) is a former freestyle swimmer from Switzerland, who competed in three Summer Olympics for his native country, starting in 1984.

Halsall was born in Geneva.  His mother is Swiss and his father was born in Jamaica.

Halsall broke the world record in the 50m Freestyle on July 21, 1985. The next year he won the silver medal in the same event at the 1986 World Aquatics Championships in Madrid, Spain. He retired after the 1992 Summer Olympics in Barcelona, Spain.

External links
 Personal website

1963 births
Living people
Swiss people of Jamaican descent
Sportspeople of Jamaican descent
Olympic swimmers of Switzerland
Swimmers at the 1984 Summer Olympics
Swimmers at the 1988 Summer Olympics
Swimmers at the 1992 Summer Olympics
Swiss male freestyle swimmers
World record setters in swimming
World Aquatics Championships medalists in swimming
Sportspeople from Geneva